The 2015 South Africa Sevens was the second tournament within the 2015–16 World Rugby Sevens Series and the seventeenth edition of the South Africa Sevens. It was held over the weekend of 12-13 December 2015 at Cape Town Stadium in Cape Town, South Africa.

Format
The teams were drawn into four pools of four teams each, with each team playing every other team in their pool once. The top two teams from each pool advanced to the Cup/Plate brackets. The bottom two teams from each group went to the Bowl/Shield brackets.

Teams
The 16 participating teams for the tournament:

Pool Stage

Pool A

Pool B

Pool C

Pool D

Knockout stage

Shield

Bowl

Plate

Cup

References

External links
World Rugby Sevens Series website

South Africa Sevens
South Africa Sevens
Sevens